Sébastien Raguin (born 14 February 1980) is a French former professional rugby league footballer who played for the Catalans Dragons in the Super League; he played as a  or . He is the current first team coach for Toulouse Olympique in the RFL League 1.

Background
Raguin was born in Toulouse, France.

Career
Raguin first caught the eye in 2005 playing for Toulouse Olympique during their famous run to the semi-finals of the Challenge Cup. He famously played for them semi-professionally whilst working during the week as a traffic warden in the city of Toulouse.

In 2007 he signed with the Catalans Dragons, and quickly established himself as a key component of the Catalans pack. His 2007 season was punctuated by injury, however he became an ever-present in the Catalans Dragons side during their run to the Super League play-offs in 2008, where he frequently played in the centres striking up a good partnership with Younes Khattabi.

He was named in the France training squad for the 2008 Rugby League World Cup.

He was named in the France squad for the 2008 Rugby League World Cup.

References

External links
Super League profile

1980 births
Living people
Catalans Dragons players
France national rugby league team players
French rugby league players
Rugby league second-rows
Rugby league centres
Sportspeople from Toulouse
Toulouse Olympique coaches
Toulouse Olympique players